Purge is the upcoming ninth studio album by English industrial metal band Godflesh set for release on 9 June 2023. The album, originally announced on 1 March 2023, "revisits and updates the concepts explored on Pure," the group's 1992 sophomore effort. The title "Purge" refers to how frontman Justin Broadrick "utilises Godflesh's music as a temporary relief from his diagnosed autism and PTSD."

Broadrick teased the first single, "Nero," on social media accounts in early March 2023. The song, along with three in-house remixes, is set to release on 3 April 2023.

Track listing
All songs written by Justin Broadrick and Ben Green.

Personnel
 Justin Broadrick – guitars, vocals, production, machines
 Ben Green – bass

References

2023 albums
Godflesh albums
Justin Broadrick albums
Albums produced by Justin Broadrick
Self-released albums